Hudiya is a 300-year-old village in Makrana Tehsil in Rajasthan state in India.

Villages in Nagaur district